The Canadian Party for Renewal, also branded the Canadian Renewal Party, was an unregistered political party in Canada, established in 1993. It was closely aligned with the Communist Party of Canada (Marxist-Leninist).

When the Renewal Party was launched in early 1993, supporter Robert Cruise described it as "a strictly non-partisan organization without ideological bias," whose purpose was to seek "broad unity around a minimum program of changing the political process so as to empower Canadians." He said that the party would give citizens control over the selection of parliamentarians, who could be recalled by the electorate if they did not act in the interest of the people. The Renewal Party also favoured direct democracy initiatives such as referendums and ballot propositions.

Cruise was himself a candidate of the Marxist-Leninist Party in 1993, and he launched his campaign in partnership with two Renewal candidates from neighbouring ridings (both of whom later officially registered as Marxist-Leninists). He denied that the Renewal Party was a front organization, however, and said that it was open for anyone to join. In the same period, Marxist-Leninist Party leader Hardial Bains said that his organization was the only political organization in Canada to put all of its resources at the disposal of the Renewal Party.

There are conflicting reports as to the identity of the Renewal Party's leader. A Windsor Star report from September 13, 1993, lists Jeffrey Goodman as having held this position. However, a more detailed report from the same newspaper later in the month indicates that Hardial Bains was the national leader of both parties.

The Renewal Party used the slogan, "Accountability begins at home," for the 1993 federal election. It did not run enough candidates to be recognized as an official party by Elections Canada, and its candidates appeared on the ballot as "non-affiliated". The Renewal Party appears to have been dissolved after this time, and several Renewal candidates from 1993 later ran as Marxist-Leninist Party candidates.

In Ontario, several candidates affiliated with the Marxist-Leninist Party ran for the Ontario Renewal Party in the 1995 provincial election. The Marxist-Leninists also endorsed ten independent Renewal candidates in 2003. The Marxist-Leninist Party is not registered provincially in Ontario.

Publications
Hardial Bains, A Power to Share: A Modern Definition of the Political Process and a Case for its Democratic Renewal, Ottawa: 1993.

References

1993 establishments in Canada
Political parties established in 1993
Defunct political parties in Canada
Communist Party of Canada (Marxist–Leninist)
Direct democracy parties